Eristena mesilauensis is a moth in the family Crambidae. It was described by Wolfram Mey in 2009. It is found on Sabah.

References

Acentropinae
Moths described in 2009